Wiremu Tamihana Tarapipipi Te Waharoa ( – 27 December 1866), generally known as Wiremu Tamihana, was a leader of the Ngāti Hauā Māori iwi in nineteenth century New Zealand, and is sometimes known as the kingmaker for his role in the Māori King Movement.

Early life
Tarapipipi Te Waharoa, later known as Wiremu Tamihana, was born around 1805 at Tamahere on the Horotiu plains, the son of the Māori chief Te Waharoa and Rangi Te Wiwini. His father was the leader of the tribe Ngāti Hauā, which settled the area along the Waikato River near Horotiu as far east as the Kaimai Ranges. In his youth he fought in several expeditions that took place in the Taranaki and Waikato as part of the Musket Wars.

In 1835, Tarapipipi met Reverend A. N. Brown, who had set up a Church Mission Society (CMS) station near the Matamata pā. He was taught to read and write in the Māori language and soon would become a key communicator for his father. He was still from time to time engaged in outbreaks of intertribal warfare, particularly against Te Arawa tribes; during one raid in the Rotorua region, he intervened to ensure the safety of two missionaries during the destruction of the CMS station at Ohinemutu by the Te Arawa tribe Ngāti Whakaue, with whom Ngāti Hauā was fighting. The conflict at this time led to Brown abandoning the CMS station at Matamata and shifting to Tuaranga but he continued to influence Tarapipipi with his Christian teachings.

As chief

Following the death of his father in September 1838, Tarapipipi became a leader of Ngāti Hauā despite being the second oldest son. He quickly stamped his authority as chief, when he resisted efforts by his tribe to carry out raids against Te Arawa. In October 1838, wielding a bible and referring to Christian ideals, he made an impassioned plea at a hui of Tauranga and Ngāti Hauā Māori against war with Te Arawa. His efforts prevented a major battle between the tribes although there some isolated fighting.

Soon after taking over as chief of Ngāti Hauā, Tarapipipi had founded a new pā near Matamata, naming it Te Tapiri with rules based on the ten commandments. By the following year, there were 300 people living at Te Tapiri, which now included a chapel and a school. By this time, Tarapipipi had converted to Christianity, being baptised by Brown at Tauranga and given the Christian name Wiremu Tamihana, which translates to William Thompson.

The replacement church was capable of holding up to a thousand people. There is no doubt Tamihana was a highly intelligent man with a creative mind keen to learn from the British. He also taught in a school, established farming in his community, and traded produce to Pākehā settlers in Auckland. Another Christian community was founded in 1846 at Peria. He sold many acres of his tribal land that was swampy to the Scottish Morrin brothers who hired Irish navvies to dig ditches and drain the land and turn it into some of the most fertile dairy land in New Zealand.

In the late 1850s, Tamihana was largely responsible for the establishment of the Māori King Movement, which aimed to unify rebel Māori by setting up a kingship in opposition to the British government.  He was able to persuade several iwi to join the movement, and Potatau Te Wherowhero of Ngāti Mahuta to take on the role of first King. Tamihana provided a statement of laws, based on the Bible. Although the movement was seen by many Pākehā and the government as rebellion, Tamihana intended that the Māori King would be in alliance with Queen Victoria. Tamihana became a diplomat and publicist for the movement, founding a Māori language newspaper for it. In 1861 Governor Thomas Gore Browne issued a declaration demanding Māori submission to the British Crown. Tamihana wrote to him explaining that the King Movement was not in conflict with the Queen but refused to swear the oath of allegiance. He expressed concern that the Governor seemed intent on war but failed to see the implications of rebellion. Later, he wrote a series of 14 threatening letters to Grey who realised that Tamihana was backed by the fierce Rewi Maniapoto. When war did break out, after the killing of 7 British soldiers in a time of peace in Taranaki and the attempted murder of Gorst, a government agent at Te Awamutu, Tamihana remained in favour of negotiation, but others within the King Movement, such as Rewi Maniapoto preferred to fight. Throughout the Invasion of the Waikato Tamihana attempted to negotiate with government forces, to little effect. After the war he campaigned against the resultant confiscation of land.

Later life and legacy

In 1865 the Pai Mārire movement (commonly known as Hauhau) was active on the Eastern Bay of Plenty and at Opotiki on 2 March shot, hanged and decapitated the German-born Rev. Carl Sylvius Völkner. Following the so-called Völkner Incident, Tamihana separated himself from the Pai Mārire movement and returned to his land.

Tamihana became ill in July 1866 but despite this continued to play a role in tribal matters. He intervened in disputes between Tauranga Maori and surveyors and attend hearings at the Native Land Court. He died at Turanga-o-moana, near Peria, on 27 December 1866. By 1873, Waikato rebels had 120,000 acres of land returned and in 1926 and 1946 were paid large sums of cash annually as full and final payment for land. Tamihana's iwi Ngāti Hauā were keen land sellers and this later bought them into conflict with Ngāti Maniapoto over the issue of land ownership or mana whenua. Tupu Taingakawa was one of Tamihana's sons.

Tamihana continues to be recognised today, with the NZ Herald naming him one of the 10 greatest New Zealanders of the past 150 years and the new main connector road between SH21 (Airport Road) and Devine Road running along the public reserve in the heart of Tamahere bears his name : Wiremu Tamihana Drive.

Notes

External links
 Morrin Museum

1805 births
1866 deaths
People of the New Zealand Wars
Ngāti Hauā people